Georg Wilhelm von Arnim (Schloss Suckow, 3 October 1806 – Schloss Suchow, 9 November 1845), 4th Lord of the Fideicomis of Suckow in the Grand Duchy of Mecklenburg-Schwerin, was a German Nobleman.

Career
He was a Gentleman of the Bedchamber of the King of Prussia.

Marriage and children
He married in Berlin on April 6, 1837, Marie Josephine Ernestine Adamine Gräfin von Blumenthal (Magdeburg, December 18, 1811 – December 27, 1865), and had issue, among whom a son Georg Abraham Constantin von Arnim.

References

1806 births
1845 deaths
Georg Wilhelm